The University of the East College of Computer Studies and Systems pioneered in the offering of a baccalaureate degree in Computer Science in the University Belt area starting 1988. Presently the Commission on Higher Education (CHED) has identified the University of the East as a Center of Excellence in Information Technology Education.

History

As early as 1984, the University started offering computer courses built into the curriculum of the BS in Business Administration program, both as credit-earning subjects as well as non-degree computer courses.
In 1986, the CCSS was known as the Computer Institute for Studies and Systems (CISS). Its initial offerings up to 1987 were non-degree computer training programs conducted in consortium with the University of the Philippines. Nati C. San Gabriel was the Director of the CISS and later the Dean when the Institute became a College.

After Dean San Gabriel’s retirement in 1997, Presidio R. Calumpit Jr.-who was crucial to the transformation of the CISS into the CCSS-became the second CCSS Dean in May 1997. An Economics graduate of CAS Manila and a Master of Science in Computer Science graduate of the Ateneo de Manila University, Dean Calumpit holds the CCSS deanship to this day, along with being the National President of the Philippine Society of Information Technology Educators Foundation Inc. (PSITE) and a Member of the Board of Directors of the Philippine Computer Society (PCS), both for SY 2004-2005.

The UE Management has been supportive in updating physical facilities since the first semester SY 1998-1999, with the major renovation of the CCSS Academic Building. Today the College has five computer laboratory rooms at the ground floor and four at the Panfilo O. Domingo Center for IT Building.

The university migrates from ATM to Gigabit Ethernet to support growing online requirements. Expanding online learning capabilities and improving administrative functionality at its Manila campus with an Ethernet networking solution from Nortel Networks. With the upgrade this will significantly improve speed and performance of student and faculty access to online learning resources and academic records. The upgrade will also support the University’s plan for a unified communications network ultimately linking the Manila facility with campuses in Caloocan and Quezon City.

Department Profile

The college curriculum spans from computer programming, computer organization, computer systems, data structures and algorithms, file processing, programming languages, database systems, software engineering, artificial intelligence and computer networks.

Besides the four-year Bachelor of Science in Computer Science (BSCS) program, and in response to the needs of the industry, the College has added three other courses: a two-year degree program in Associate in Computer Technology (ACT) in June 1998, a four-year degree program in Bachelor of Science in Information Technology (BSIT) in June 2000, and a four-year program in Bachelor of Science in Information Management (BSIM) in June 2004.

Curricular Offerings

Bachelor of Science in Computer Science (BSCS) Level III accreditation by PACUCOA 
Bachelor of Science in Information Technology (BSIT)
Bachelor of Science in Information System (BSIS)
Bachelor Of Science in Entertainment and Multimedia Computing (BSEMC) 
 With Specializations in Digital Animation and Game Development
Associate in Computer Technology (ACT)

Graduate Degree

Master in Information Management (MIM)
Master in Information System (MIS)

Center of Excellence for IT Education

The Commission on Higher Education (CHED) in cooperation with the Technical panel for Information Technology Education (TPITE) identified the University of the East as a Center of Development in Information Technology Education.

The status of Center of Development (COD) in Information Technology is one of the projects of CHED, where the main objective is to give recognition to all higher education institution (HEIs)—public and private alike—offering computer courses and which have demonstrated the highest degree or standards along the areas of instruction, research and extension.

Academic resources

College Library
Internet Laboratory
Network Laboratory
Multimedia Laboratory
Electronics Laboratory
Language Laboratory

Educational Affiliations

The CCSS provides education to its students especially through the College’s tie-ups with three global education partners: 
Java Education and Development Initiative (JEDI) - JEDI is a collaborative project that aims to make high-quality, industry-endorsed IT and Computer Science course material available for free. The course materials are developed with inputs from industry and conforms to international education standards. JEDI materials and resources are developed, used and enhanced in a collaborative environment using Java.net. JEDI is a project of Sun Microsystems, Inc. through the University of the Philippines Java Research and Development Center and in partnership with various groups from the Education and Industry Sectors.
Microsoft Corporation - the CCSS has three partnership agreements-under the 
Microsoft IT Academy Program (MSITA)
Microsoft Developer Network Academic Alliance (MSDNAA)
Microsoft Learning (MSL).
Oracle Corporation - via the Oracle University and Oracle Academic Initiative (OU-OAI) programs
Pearson Education Asia

See also
University of the East

References

University of the East http://www.ue.edu.ph

Computer Studies and Systems